CPT or Cpt may stand for:

Common uses 

 Culminating Performance Task, a test given out to Canadian students that can add up to worth 30% of their overall mark
 CPT (file format), of Corel Photo Paint and others
 CPT (programadora), a defunct Colombian television production company
 CPT Corporation, a 20th-century word processor manufacturer
 Colored people's time, offensive US expression for lateness
 Columbia Pictures Television, branch of Columbia Pictures
 Cost per thousand, advertising term
 Curricular Practical Training, US temporary employment authorization
 Pastoral Land Commission, a Catholic environmental group in Brazil that helped found the Landless Workers Movement
 The abbreviation for US Army Captain
The abbreviation for Compton, California

Politics 
 Christian Peacemaker Teams
 Committee for the Prevention of Torture, Council of Europe
 Communist Party of Thailand, 1942-1990s
 Paraguayan Workers Confederation (Confederación Paraguaya de Trabajadores)

Science and mathematics 
 Canadian Penning Trap Mass Spectrometer, at Argonne National Laboratory
 Conditional probability table
 Cone penetration test, to determine properties of soils
 Coprecipitation, an important process in analytical chemistry and radiochemistry
 CPT symmetry (charge, parity, and time symmetry) of physical laws
 Cumulative prospect theory in economic modeling

Medicine 
 8-Cyclopentyl-1,3-dimethylxanthine (8-CPT), a stimulant drug
 Camptothecin, an anti-cancer drug
 Carboxypeptidase T, an enzyme
 Carnitine palmitoyltransferase I (CPT1A, CPT1, CPT1-L, L-CPT1), a mitochondrial enzyme
 Certified Personal Trainer, a personal trainer with a varying degree of knowledge of general fitness
 Chest physiotherapy
 Cognitive processing therapy, a psychotherapeutic approach
 Continuous Performance Task, measurement of attention
 Current Procedural Terminology, AMA medical code set
 Troparil (β-CPT), a dopamine reuptake inhibitor

Transport 
 Cape Town International Airport, South Africa, IATA airport code
 Clapton railway station, UK, station code
 Corporate Air, Montana, US, ICAO airline designator
 Carriage Paid To, an International Commercial Term used in transport

See also
 Captain (disambiguation)